Robert Haldane (28 February 1764 – 12 December 1842) was a religious writer and Scottish theologian. Author of Commentaire sur l'Épître aux Romains, On the Inspiration of Scripture and Exposition of the Epistle to the Romans.

Early life 

Robert Haldane 3rd of Airthrey was the son of James Haldane 2nd of Airthrey, and his wife, Katherine Duncan. Robert was born on 28 February 1764 in Queen Anne Street, Cavendish Square in London. Robert and his younger brother James Alexander Haldane were raised by their grandmother Lady Lundie and uncles. Robert and James attended classes at Dundee Grammar School, the Royal High School in Edinburgh, and the University of Edinburgh.

In 1780 Robert joined HMS Monarch as an officer, of which his maternal uncle, Adam Duncan, was in command. In 1781, he was transferred to HMS Foudroyant.  He was on HMS Foudroyant under John Jervis during the night engagement  in April 1782 with the French ship Pegase and greatly distinguished himself. Haldane was afterwards present at the relief of Gibraltar in September 1782. Some months later after the peace treaty of 1783, he left the Royal Navy.

Airthrey Estate 

Soon after leaving the Navy, he settled on his family estate Airthrey, near Stirling where he contacted the Whites of Durham to landscape the grounds. These estate improvements included the creation of a man-made loch, rolling lawns, several wooded plantations, a hermitage and a boundary wall which is nearly four miles in length. In 1790 he commissioned the neoclassical architect Robert Adam to make a draft for the building of Airthrey Castle of which Adam created two designs. Haldane picked his favourite design but chose to have Thomas Russell complete the works instead of Robert Adam. Airthrey Castle was completed in 1791 and as built corresponded largely to the final design by Robert Adam without the forecourt which was never built.  Although there were changes to the north facade in the late nineteenth century, the south facade is still essentially as designed by Adam.

Evangelism
Robert's tutor was David Bogue of Gosport. After reading about the start of the French Revolution he grew to disapprove strongly of the war with France. Robert resolved to devote himself to advancing Christianity.  In 1795 Robert converted to the evangelical church shortly after his brother James converted. Robert became one of the first members of the London Missionary Society in 1795, the same year that he was converted. He offered the British Government and the East India Company to sell Airthrey Estate in order to set up a vast mission in Bengal but was turned down by the East India Company, and the mission was abandoned.

In December 1797 he also joined his brother and some others in the formation of the "Society for the Propagation of the Gospel at Home," in building chapels or "tabernacles" for congregations, in supporting missionaries, and in maintaining institutions for the education of young men to carry on the work of evangelization. In 1798 he sold the Airthrey Estate to Robert Abercromby to obtain funding for his mission work and with the funds raised to set up the Society for Propagating the Gospel at Home in Edinburgh. In 1799 Robert organised for Plean Estate to be sold and this was bought in 1800 by Francis Simpson.

Over the next twelve years (1798–1810) he gave over £70,000 pounds; this was used to further the cause of the Society for Propagating the Gospel at Home by building chapels for congregations, supporting missionaries and helping to maintain institutions for young men to be educated to carry on the work of evangelization. Robert was inspired by George Whitefield's two tabernacles in London and built preaching centres strategically placed throughout Scotland. These tabernacles were located in Glasgow, Dundee, Perth, Thurso, Wick, Edinburgh and Elgin. His brother James took over the Edinburgh tabernacle until 1851.

Robert funded John Campbell's Society for the Education of Africans which initially planned to evangelise in Africa by bringing over native children to be trained as Christian missionaries in Edinburgh. However, owing to an outbreak of smallpox, the group of children remained in the London area at what became known as the African Academy in Clapham.

From 1799 to 1807, Robert set up theological seminars in Glasgow, Edinburgh and Dundee to train young men with a passion for the gospel. Young men would come and train for 2–3 years with all their expenses paid for. Over this time 300 men were trained and sent out to spread their teachings all over the world.

In 1816 Robert published a work on the Evidences and Authority of Divine Revelation.  In the summer of 1816 Robert Haldane visited Europe, first at Geneva and afterwards in Montauban. He lectured and interviewed large numbers of theological students with remarkable effect; among them were César Malan, Frédéric Monod and Jean-Henri Merle d'Aubigné. This circle of men spread the revival of evangelical Protestant Christianity across the continent of Europe (Le Réveil), impacting France, Germany (Die Erweckung) and the Netherlands (Het Reveil). Through conversion and missionary impetus the effects of this revival were felt as far afield as Italy and Hungary.

Later life 
In 1819, Robert had his theological prelections published in a Commentaire sur l'Épître aux Romains. He returned to Scotland in 1819 to live partly at the estate he had bought in 1809, Auchengray and partly in Edinburgh at 10 Duke Street
 (later renamed Dublin Street). Like his brother James, he took part in many of the religious controversies of the time, mainly through correspondence in the newspapers.

Robert's later writing included a number of pamphlets on the Apocrypha controversy, as well as a treatise On the Inspiration of Scripture which was published in 1828 and a later Exposition of the Epistle to the Romans published in 1835, which has been translated into French and German.

Robert died on 12 December in 1842 in Edinburgh and was buried in Glasgow Cathedral.

Works by Haldane 
 Address to the public: concerning political opinions, and plans lately adopted to promote religion in Scotland, 1800
 Letters to Mr. Ewing, respecting the Tabernacle at Glasgow, 1809
 Commentaire sur l'Épître aux Romains, 1819
 Review of the conduct of the directors of the British and Foreign Bible Society, relative to the Apocrypha, 1825
 Second review of the conduct of the directors of the British & Foreign Bible Society : containing an account of the religious state of the continent ; in answer to a letter addressed to the author, by the Rev. Dr. Steinkopff, 1826
 Exposure of the Rev. Henry Grey's personal misrepresentations, doctrinal heresies, and important , respecting the Bible Society, as contained in the letters of Anglicanus, 1828
 On the Inspiration of Scripture, 1828
 The Books of the Old and New Testaments Proved to be Canonical, and their Verbal Inspiration Maintained and Established; with an Account of the Introduction and Character of the Apocrypha, 1830
 Exposition of the Epistle to the Romans, 1835
 The duty of paying tribute enforced ; in letters to the Rev. Dr John Brown, 1838
 The Evidence and Authority of Divine Revelation, 1839
 Sanctification of the Sabbath: The Permanent Obligation to Observe the Sabbath or Lord's Day, 1842
 Exposition of the Epistle to the Romans : with remarks on the commentaries of Dr. Macknight, Professor Moses Stuart and Professor Tholuck, 1842

Family
Robert Haldane married Catherine Cochrane Oswald, daughter of George Oswald of Scotstoun, on 24 April 1785. They were married for 58 years and had one child, Margaret Haldane, during their marriage. Margaret married James Farquhar Gordon in 1805.

Margaret died on 29 September 1849.

Church and ministry
Along with his brother, James Haldane, Robert Haldane established 85 churches in Scotland and Ireland. Churches planted by the Haldanes practiced baptism by immersion, weekly communion, and congregational polity (autonomous government). The Haldanes also operated a seminary, and were influenced in their principles by other independent thinkers such as John Glas and Robert Sandeman.

See also
Réveil

References

Further reading
Gazetteer for Scotland - Robert Haldane
Scottish Preachers Hall of Fame - Robert Haldane
Brackney, William H. A Genetic History of Baptist Thought: With Special Reference to Baptists in Britain and North America. Macon, GA: Mercer University Press, 2004. 134-135, 136-138.
Commentary on the book of Romans: EXPOSITION OF THE EPISTLE TO THE ROMANS 1817

Attribution

External links
Spark of Grace - A book about the "Haldane Revival" in France, by Joe Ridholls
The Haldane Collection at the University of Stirling

Robert
1764 births
1842 deaths
Alumni of the University of Edinburgh
People educated at the High School of Dundee
People educated at the Royal High School, Edinburgh
Restoration Movement
Royal Navy personnel of the Seven Years' War
Scottish members of the Churches of Christ
Scottish Calvinist and Reformed theologians
19th-century Calvinist and Reformed theologians
Christian revivalists
Scottish evangelicals